An atmospheric water generator (AWG), is a device that extracts water from humid ambient air, producing potable water. Water vapor in the air can be extracted by multiple techniques, including condensation - cooling the air below its dew point, exposing the air to desiccants, using membranes that only pass water vapor, collecting fog, or pressurizing the air. AWGs are useful where potable water is difficult to obtain, because water is always present in ambient air.

AWG may require significant energy inputs or operate passively, relying on natural temperature differences. Biomimicry studies have shown the Stenocara gracilipes beetle has the natural ability to perform this task.

History 

The Incas were able to sustain their culture above the rain line by collecting dew and channeling it to cisterns for later distribution. Historical records indicate the use of water-collecting fog fences. These traditional methods have usually been completely passive, employing no external energy source and relying on naturally occurring temperature variations.

Air wells are one way to passively collect moisture from air.

Brine extraction technology was contracted by the US Army and the US Navy from Terralab and the Federal Emergency Management Agency (FEMA).

DARPA's Atmospheric Water Extraction program that aims to develop a device which can provide water for 150 soldiers and be carried by four people. In February 2021 General Electric was awarded 14 million dollars to continue development of their device.

In 2022, a cellulose/konjac gum-based desiccant was demonstrated that produced 13 L/kg/day (1.56 US gal/lb/day) of water at 30% humidity, and 6 L/kg/day (0.72 US gal/lb/day) at 15% humidity.

Technologies
Cooling-based systems are the most common, while hygroscopic systems are showing promise. Hybrid systems combine adsorption, refrigeration and condensation.

Cooling condensation 

Condensing systems are the most common technology in use.

A cooling condensation type  AWG uses a compressor to circulate refrigerant through a condenser and then an evaporator coil that cools the surrounding air. Once the air temperature reaches its dew point, water condenses into the collector. A fan pushes filtered air over the coil. A purification/filtration system keeps the water pure and reduces the risk posed by ambient microorganisms.

The rate of water production depends on the ambient temperature, humidity, the volume of air passing over the coil, and the machine's capacity to cool the coil.  AWGs become more effective as relative humidity and air temperature increase. As a rule of thumb, cooling condensation  AWGs do not work efficiently when the ambient temperature falls below 18.3 °C (65 °F) or the relative humidity drops below 30%. The cost-effectiveness of an AWG depends on the capacity of the machine, local humidity and temperature conditions, and power costs.

The Peltier effect of semiconducting materials offer an alternative condensation system in which one side of the semi-conducting material heats while the other side cools. In this application, the air is forced over the cooling fans on the side that cools which lowers the air temperature. The solid-state semiconductors are convenient for portable units, but this is offset by low efficiency and high power consumption.

Potable water generation can be enhanced in low humidity conditions by using an evaporative cooler with a brackish water supply to increase the humidity. A special case is water generation in greenhouses because the inside air is much hotter and more humid. Examples include the seawater greenhouse in Oman and the IBTS Greenhouse.

In dehumidifying air conditioners, non-potable water is a by-product. The relatively cold (below the dewpoint) evaporator coil condenses water vapor from the processed air.

When powered by coal-based electricity it has one of the worst carbon footprints of any water source (exceeding reverse osmosis seawater desalination by three orders of magnitude) and it demands more than four times as much water up the supply chain than it delivers to the user.

Hygroscopy
Hygroscopic techniques pull water from the air via absorption or adsorption. These materials desiccate the air. Desiccants may be liquid ("wet") or solid.

Wet desiccants 
Liquid desiccants include lithium chloride or lithium bromide.

Another wet desiccant is concentrated brine. The brine absorbs water, which is then extracted and purified. One portable device runs on a generator.

Another variation claims to be more environmentally friendly, by relying on passive solar energy and gravity. Concentrated brine is streamed down the outside of towers, absorbing water vapor. The brine then enters a chamber, subjected to a partial vacuum and heated, releasing water vapor that is condensed and collected. As the condensed water is removed from the system using gravity, it creates a vacuum which lowers the brine's boiling point.

Solid desiccants 
Silica gel and zeolite desiccate pressurized air. Direct potable water generating devices using sunlight are under development. One device takes  to make 1 liter of water. It uses a zirconium/organic metal-organic framework on a porous copper base, attached to a graphite substrate. The sun heats the graphite, releasing the water, which then cools the graphite.

Fuel cells 
A hydrogen fuel cell car generates one liter of drinking quality water for every 8 miles (12.87 kilometers) traveled by combining hydrogen with ambient oxygen.

Power

Unless the air is super-saturated with vapor, an energy input is required to harvest water from the atmosphere. The energy required is a strong function of the humdity and temperature. It can be calculated using Gibbs free energy.

Potable water can be generated by rooftop solar hydropanels using solar power and solar heat.

Hydrogels can be used to capture moisture (e.g. at night in a desert) to cool solar panels or to produce fresh water – including for irrigating crops as demonstrated in solar panel integrated systems where these have been enclosed next to or beneath the panels within the system.

One study reported that such devices could help provide potable water to one billion people, although off-the-grid generation could "undermine efforts to develop permanent piped infrastructure".

See also

Air well (condenser)
Dehumidifier
Desalination
Dew pond
Fog collection
Rainwater harvesting
Solar chimney
Solar still
Watergen
Watermaker
Water scarcity

References

Drinking water
Water supply
Water and the environment